Trimbakeshwar is a tehsil of Nashik subdivision of Nashik district in Maharashtra, India.

References

External links
The Trimbakeshwar Temple website

Talukas in Maharashtra
Nashik district